Alicia Cardenas was an Indigenous Mexican American tattoo artist and muralist in Denver's tattoo scene who was noted for being a Chicana feminist artist in a male-centric career. She owned the Sol Tribe tattoo shop, which had been a longstanding feature of Denver. She was featured in a documentary on Chicano muralism by the Chicano Murals of Colorado Project referred to as "These Storied Walls." In her community she was known as "Mama Matriarch."  At the age of 44 she was murdered in a mass shooting, along with four other people.

Artist 
In the late 1990s, she opened a tattoo shop Twisted Sol in the Capitol Hill neighborhood of Denver. She cleaned houses and delivered pizzas to achieve her dream of opening a tattoo shop.

As a muralist, she painted numerous murals throughout the city of Denver. One of her notable works can be found in the Five Points neighborhood and is entitled "Crush Walls" completed in 2020. She took part in the city's Babe Walls and RiNo Crush Walls events.

She mentored many artists in the community. She curated three art shows for the Chicano Humanities & Arts Council in Denver. As an artist, she embraced the worldview of Chicanismo and interconnectedness. She was also a social activist and advocate for LGBTQ+ rights.

She was involved in the Mesoamerican dance and arts community.

Death 
In 2021, at the age of 44, she was murdered in a mass shooting in Denver, along with four other people. The Chicano Humanities and Arts Council, Museo de las Americas, Bobby LeFebre, and her many family and friends mourned her loss and remember her legacy. She was remembered for her bright personality, always taking chances, and being a wonderful mother.

She was honored as a corn mother, as part of a multi-generational and multi-cultural exhibit celebrating women. Her life quote was to "become in harmony with the Earth and your fellow humans. Stay humble and work hard. Push to be a role model and show up for your community."

External links 

 "These Storied Walls: Chicano Community Murals of Colorado"
 "Re-opening of gallery features tribute to Alicia Cardenas" PBS

References 

20th-century births
2021 deaths
Chicano art
Indigenous artists of the Americas
Indigenous Mexican American culture
Chicana feminists